Yevgeni Yevgenyevich Khrabrostin (born 4 October 1974) is a former Russian football player and referee.

He worked as a referee in the Russian Third League in 1997.

His father, also named Yevgeni Khrabrostin, played football professionally, winning the Soviet Top League in 1977 with FC Torpedo Moscow.

References

1974 births
Living people
Russian footballers
FC KAMAZ Naberezhnye Chelny players
Russian Premier League players
FC Asmaral Moscow players
Russian football referees
Place of birth missing (living people)
Association football defenders
FC Lokomotiv Moscow players
FC Torpedo Moscow players
FC Torpedo-2 players
FC Torpedo Vladimir players
FC Volga Ulyanovsk players